Team Peugeot Total is the factory team of French car manufacture Peugeot. The team competes in the Dakar Rally and the FIA World Rallycross Championship.

Main victories
The team won two Dakar Rally and one 24 Hours of Le Mans.

Rally raid cars

2015-2016
Peugeot 2008 DKR
2017-2018
Peugeot 3008 DKR

Team 2018
Are four the teams for rally raid 2018 season.

Racing record

Complete FIA World Rallycross Championship results
(key)

Supercar

* Season still in progress.

See also
 Peugeot Sport
 Total S.A.
 Red Bull (main sponsor)

References

External links
 Official site
 Total Competition

French auto racing teams
Dakar rally racing teams
Red Bull sports teams
World Rallycross Championship teams